Ali Jaafar Mohamed Ahmed Madan (born 30 November 1995) is a Bahraini footballer who plays as a winger for Ajman on loan from Al-Riffa and the Bahrain national team.

Career
Madan was included in Bahrain's squad for the 2019 AFC Asian Cup in the United Arab Emirates. He was called-up to participate in the 24th Arabian Gulf Cup in Qatar. On 5 December 2019, Madan scored the crucial penalty against Iraq which qualified Bahrain to the tournament's final.

Career statistics

International

International goals
Scores and results list Bahrain's goal tally first.

References

External links
 
 
 
 
 Ali Madan at WorldFootball.com

1995 births
Living people
Bahraini footballers
Bahraini expatriate footballers
Bahrain international footballers
People from the Northern Governorate
Association football wingers
Bahraini Premier League players
UAE Pro League players
Al-Shabab Club (Manama) players
Al-Najma SC (Bahrain) players
Riffa SC players
Al Urooba Club players
Ajman Club players
Expatriate footballers in the United Arab Emirates
Bahraini expatriate sportspeople in the United Arab Emirates
2019 AFC Asian Cup players